KYVV-TV (channel 28) is a television station in Del Rio, Texas, United States, affiliated with the digital multicast network Grit. The station is owned by Stryker Media, and maintains transmitter facilities on US 277 southeast of Del Rio. Its signal is relayed in widescreen standard definition on the third digital subchannel of Univision owned-and-operated station KWEX-DT (channel 41.3) in San Antonio.

History
On July 10, 1991, the Federal Communications Commission (FCC) granted a construction permit to Republic Broadcasting Company for a new TV station on analog channel 10 in Del Rio. The company, headed by Thomas Robert Gilchrist, chose KTRG as call letters for the station. However, the station was not on air by December 1996, when the construction permit was sold to Ortiz Broadcasting Corporation. Under its ownership, channel 10 began broadcasting on September 1, 1997. On April 6, 1998, KTRG joined UPN. It also briefly aired a local newscast.

In May 1999, KTRG was switched to programming from the Faith Pleases God church owned by Ortiz (who also founded the Fe-TV and La Familia Network channels). This continued until 2005, when Ortiz Broadcasting Corporation took the station silent for financial reasons, having gone into bankruptcy. It was then sold to SATV 10, LLC, in 2006; this company was owned by Barbara Laurence. SATV10 undertook the lengthy process of finding a suitable site to resume operations, as the tower site lease was not included in the assets of the bankrupt estate. This was accomplished, but SATV10 filed for bankruptcy protection itself in 2009, emerging the next year.

In 2010, KTRG and another Laurence-owned station, KMCC in Laughlin, affiliated with VasalloVision, which they aired until August 13, 2012, when KYVV-TV (having changed its call letters to reflect the VasalloVision programming) became an affiliate of MundoFox (later MundoMax). The station went silent on May 12, 2016.

Stryker Media agreed to purchase KYVV-TV from SATV 10 for $450,000 on October 12, 2017. CNZ Communications, a sister company to Stryker, has operated the station under a local marketing agreement since June 26, 2017. The sale was completed on April 6, 2018. KYVV-TV returned to the air on July 1, 2018, as an affiliate of Grit.

Subchannels
The station's digital signal is multiplexed:

References

External links
 

Television channels and stations established in 1997
1997 establishments in Texas
Television stations in Texas
Spanish-language television stations in Texas
Del Rio, Texas
Grit (TV network) affiliates
Buzzr affiliates
LATV affiliates